Johnny Boy was a Liverpool pop duo.

Music
Johnny Boy (album), by the Liverpool duo
Johnny Boy Would Love This...A Tribute to John Martyn, tribute album to John Martyn 2011
"Johnny Boy", song by Melanie Safka from Affectionately Melanie 1969
"Johnny Boy", song by Gary Moore from Ballads & Blues 1982–1994 and The Platinum Collection (Gary Moore album)
"Johnny Boy", song from Twenty One Pilots (album)

People
John "Johnny Boy" D'Amato New Jersey mobster
John "Johnny Boy" Gotti mobster
"Johnny Boy" Civello, in the film Mean Streets played by Robert De Niro
Johnny Boy Soprano from List of The Sopranos characters